Jet Jongeling (born 1977, Delft) is a Dutch cyclo-cross, road and track racing cyclist. She won the Dutch National Time Trial Championships in 1995. She is the younger sister of Maria Jongeling who won the Dutch National Time Trial the year before.

Palmares

1994
2nd, Dutch National Cyclo-cross Championships
1995
1st, Dutch National Time Trial Championships
2nd, Dutch National Track Championships, Individual pursuit
3rd, Dutch National Track Championships, 500 m time trial
6th, World Road Championships, time trial (junior)
1996
3rd, Dutch National Time Trial Championships
2nd, Dutch National Track Championships, Individual pursuit
2ns, Dutch National Track Championships, 500 m time trial
Sources

References

External links
 

1977 births
Living people
Dutch female cyclists
Sportspeople from Delft
Dutch cycling time trial champions
Cyclists from South Holland
20th-century Dutch women